Mercedes-Benz has sold a number of automobiles with the "200" model name:

Mercedes-Benz 200 may refer to:

 1965–1968 W110
 1965–1967 200D
 1965–1968 200
 1968–1976 W115
 200D/8
 1976–1985 W123
 1984–1992 W124, 1984–1995/96 version of the E-Class

200